NPL (for NonProcedural Language) was a relational database language developed by T.D. Truitt et al.<ref name="Truitt83">"An Introduction to Nonprocedural Languages Using NPL", T.D. Truitt et al., McGraw-Hill 1983.</ref> in 1980 for Apple II and MS-DOS.
In general, a non-procedural language (also called a declarative language) requires the programmer to specify what the program should do, rather than (as with a procedural language) providing the sequential steps indicating how'' the program should perform its task(s).

Notes and references

Query languages